The following is an episode list from the FXX series, Cake.

Series overview

Episodes

Season 1 (2019)

Season 2 (2020)

Season 3 (2020)

Specials (2020)
Eight specials for the series aired in 2020, six of which featured repackaged content from other episodes and two of which featured new content. The six repackaged specials included "Sheet Cake: Oh Jerome, No," which featured all of the "Oh Jerome, No" segments from Season 1 presented in order without the inclusion of other segments, and five "Pound Cake: Shark Lords" specials, each of which featured two "Shark Lords" segments from Season 2 without the inclusion of other segments. The two specials featuring new content were titled "Pound Cake: Thirsty," which was an original short film, and "Sad Day," which was an original music video. Neither of these specials included other segments.

Season 4 (2021)

Season 5 (2021)

References

Lists of American adult animated television series episodes
Lists of American comedy television series episodes